Podolsk was a Hansa A Type cargo ship which was built as Weserstrand in 1944 by NV Nederland Scheepsbouw  Maatschappij, Amsterdam, Netherlands for Norddeutscher Lloyd. She was seized as a prize of war in 1945, passing to the Ministry of War Transport and renamed Empire Gala. She was allocated to the Soviet Union in 1946, she was renamed Podolsk. She served until 1948 when she ran aground in the Yangtze and sank

Description

The ship was propelled by a compound steam engine, which had two cylinders of 42 cm (16 inches) and two cylinders of 90 cm (35 inches) diameter by 90 cm (35 inches) stroke. The engine was built by Werkspoor NV, Amsterdam.

History
Weserstrand was a Hansa A Type cargo ship built in 1944 as yard number 354 by NV Nederland Scheepsbouw  Maatschappij, Amsterdam, North Holland, Netherlands for Norddeutscher Lloyd. Launched on 1 July 1944, she was completed by Rickmers Werft, Bremerhaven, Germany in March 1945. Her port of registry was Bremen.

In May 1945, Weserstrand was seized as a prize of war at Kiel. She was passed to the Ministry of War Transport. She was renamed Empire Gala. The Code Letters GJFW and United Kingdom Official Number 180604 were allocated. Her port of registry was London and she was operated under the management of France, Fenwick, Tyne & Wear Co. Ltd.

In 1946, Empire Gage was allocated to the Soviet Union and was renamed Podolsk. She served until 9 January 1948, when she ran aground on the Amherst Rocks, in the Yangtze  from Wusong, China. Podolsk sank on 11 January.

References

1944 ships
Ships built by Nederlandsche Scheepsbouw Maatschappij
World War II merchant ships of Germany
Steamships of Germany
Ships of Norddeutscher Lloyd
Empire ships
Ministry of War Transport ships
Merchant ships of the United Kingdom
Steamships of the United Kingdom
Merchant ships of the Soviet Union
Steamships of the Soviet Union
Maritime incidents in 1948